The Austria women's national football team represents Austria in international women's football competition. The team is controlled by the Austrian Football Association.

The national team is made up mainly of players from the Austrian and German Women's Bundesligas. In 2016, the team qualified for its first-ever major tournament: UEFA Women's Euro 2017.

History

Beginnings
The Austrian team started playing on July 6, 1970, against Mexico in Bari, Italy, competing in the Women's World Cup 1970, unofficial competition held in that country from July 6 to July 15, 1970. The result was a 9–0 crushing defeat, which remains one of its worst results in its history, with this result Austria was quickly out of the competition, playing after months against Switzerland, repeating itself again the defeat against Mexico, 9–0.

It played two recognized friendlies against Switzerland before the first Women's World Cup in 1978 and 1990, losing both by 6–2 and 5–1. The Austrian team did not participate in the inaugural Women's World Cup 1991 in China and also the 1995 edition in Sweden, but during that time played international friendlies. Austria played Women's Euro 1997 Qualifiers, held in Norway and Sweden. It was placed in Class B, in Group 7 with Switzerland, Yugoslavia and Greece, winning three games in a single chance against their three opponents, tying a game against Greece and losing two against Switzerland and Yugoslavia, finishing third in the group and eliminated from both tournaments. Thus, Austria did not enter the 1999 World Cup Qualifiers, held in the United States. Austria ended 1999 with three games of qualifying for the Euro 2001.

2000s and 2010s
The team started 2000 with a 3–0 defeat against Belgium, four days later they lost again, with Poland by 3–2 but won 1–0 against Wales, finishing third and returning to be eliminated from a tournament. The Austrians played their first game of the 2003 World Cup Qualification against Scotland losing 2–1 with goal from Stallinger in the 21st minute, then played against Wales and won 2–0 with another goal from Stallinger and one from Schalkhammer-Hufnagl. Their third match against Belgium was a 3–1 defeat, with a goal by Spieler in the 59th minute. Austria lost their second match against Belgium 4–2, with goals from Szankovich and Fuhrmann, after a month, the team played against Scotland, with a crushing defeat for 5–0 and finally a 1–1 draw with Wales with Austria's only goal coming from Spieler in the 45th minute, ending with 4 points from one win, one tie and four losses, and thus eliminated. The latest and best performing competition of Austria was the qualification for the Women's World Cup in 2011, where they started out poorly but reached third place with 10 points, the product of three wins, one draw and four defeats. They played the 2015 Women's World Cup Qualification, but failed to qualify.

Austria qualified for the first time in its history for a European Championship finals at Euro 2017 in the Netherlands. Reversed in group C with France, Switzerland and Iceland, it thwarted the predictions by finishing in 1st place in the group with two wins (1–0 against Switzerland and 3–0 against Iceland) and a draw (1–1 against France). In the quarter-finals, the Austrians faced the Spanish, 2nd in Group D, and won the penalty shoot-out (0–0, 5–3 on penalties). Their journey ended in the semi-final against Denmark, where unlike the quarter-final win against Spain, this time they failed in the penalty shootout without making a single attempt (0–0, 0–3 pt). The turning point of the game was the missed penalty by Sarah Puntigam in the 13th minute of play which could have given Austria a decisive advantage. Nevertheless, Dominik Thalhammer's team leaves the competition with a more than honorable record, without having lost a single game and with only one goal conceded (against France in the group matches), for their first participation in a major competition.

They qualified for their 2nd consecutive Euro at the 2022 edition where they again passed the first round. Austria finished second in Group A, behind England, the host country of the competition, against whom they lost by a narrow margin (0–1), but ahead of Norway and Northern Ireland, whom they beat 1–0 and 2–0 respectively. In the quarter-finals, they faced Germany, leader of group B, for a German-speaking derby against the most successful team of the competition. In spite of a good performance in which they obtained several goal opportunities (including 3 goalposts touched), they were beaten 0–2 by the eight-time winners who were more realistic and took advantage of two Austrian defensive errors to make the difference.

Results and fixtures

The following is a list of match results in the last 12 months, as well as any future matches that have been scheduled.

Legend

2022

2023

Coaching staff

Current coaching staff

Manager history

 Ernst Weber (1999–2011)
 Dominik Thalhammer (2011–2020)
 Irene Fuhrmann (2020–)

Players

Current squad
 The following players were called up for the Friendly matches against  on 17 February and on 21 February.
 Caps and goals are current as of 21 February 2023, after second match against .

Recent call-ups
 The following players have been called up to a squad in the past 12 months.

INJ

Notes:
 : Withdrew due to injury
 : Player retired from international football
 : On stand-by

Records

 after the match against .

Players in bold are still active in the national team.

Most capped players

Top goalscorers

Competitive record

FIFA Women's World Cup

*Draws include knockout matches decided on penalty kicks.

UEFA Women's Championship

*Draws include knockout matches decided on penalty kicks.

Invitational trophies
Cyprus Women's Cup: Winner 2016

See also
Sport in Austria
Football in Austria
Women's football in Austria
Austria women's national under-20 football team
Austria women's national under-17 football team
Austria national football team

References

External links
Official website
FIFA profile
Ladies Austria results and statistic

 
European women's national association football teams